Mathematika is a peer-reviewed mathematics journal that publishes both pure and applied mathematical articles. The journal was founded by Harold Davenport in the 1950s. The journal is published by the London Mathematical Society, on behalf of the journal's owner University College London.

Indexing and abstracting
According to the Journal Citation Reports, the journal has a 2020 impact factor of 0.844. The journal in indexing in the following bibliographic databases:

 MathSciNet
 Science Citation Index Expanded
 Web of Science
 Zentralblatt MATH

References

London Mathematical Society
Mathematics education in the United Kingdom
Mathematics journals
Publications established in 1954
Quarterly journals
Wiley (publisher) academic journals
English-language journals
Academic journals associated with learned and professional societies of the United Kingdom